Teitipac may refer to different places in Tlacolula District, Oaxaca, Mexico:

Magdalena Teitipac
San Sebastián Teitipac
San Juan Teitipac